Sgùrr Eilde Mòr or Sgùrr Èilde Mhòr (in Gaelic) is a mountain in the Mamores range of the Grampian Mountains, Scotland. It is 6 kilometres north-east of Kinlochleven. It is a steep, conical peak of scree and quartzite boulders, capped with a layer of schist. With a height of 1010 m (3314 ft) it is classed as a Munro, so is popular with hillwalkers. It is most commonly climbed from Kinlochleven by way of a stalker's path which leads to a col at Coire an Lochan, and then by either the south or the west ridge - both routes involving an ascent of steep, bouldery terrain.

References 
 The Munros (SMC Guide), Donald Bennett et al., 

Munros
Marilyns of Scotland
Mountains and hills of the Central Highlands
Mountains and hills of Highland (council area)
One-thousanders of Scotland